is a Japanese archer.

Archery

She competed at the 1984 Summer Olympic Games in the women's individual event and finished fourth with 2524 points scored.

Ishizu won a bronze medal at the 1986 Asian Games in the team event.

References

External links 
 Profile on worldarchery.org

1956 births
Living people
Japanese female archers
Olympic archers of Japan
Archers at the 1984 Summer Olympics
Archers at the 1986 Asian Games
Medalists at the 1986 Asian Games
Asian Games medalists in archery
Asian Games bronze medalists for Japan
20th-century Japanese women